These are the official results of the Men's marathon event at the 1986 European Championships in Stuttgart, West Germany, held on 30 August 1986.

Medalists

Abbreviations
All times shown are in hours:minutes:seconds

Final ranking

Participation
According to an unofficial count, 28 athletes from 16 countries participated in the event.

 (2)
 (1)
 (2)
 (2)
 (2)
 (1)
 (1)
 (3)
 (1)
 (3)
 (1)
 (2)
 (1)
 (3)
 (2)
 (1)

See also
 1983 Men's World Championships Marathon (Helsinki)
 1984 Men's Olympic Marathon (Los Angeles)
 1986 Marathon Year Ranking
 1987 Men's World Championships Marathon (Rome)
 1988 Men's Olympic Marathon (Seoul)

References

External links
 Results
 marathonspiegel

Marathon
Marathons at the European Athletics Championships
1986 marathons
Men's marathons
Marathons in Germany